David Hájek (born June 13, 1980) is a Czech former professional ice hockey defenceman.

Hájek played in the Czech Extraliga for HC Kladno and HC Karlovy Vary. He also played in the Tipsport Liga for HC Slovan Bratislava and the Erste Bank Eishockey Liga for Orli Znojmo.

Hájek was drafted 239th overall by the Calgary Flames in the 2000 NHL Entry Draft.

Career statistics

Regular season and playoffs

International

External links

1980 births
Living people
Rote Teufel Bad Nauheim players
Calgary Flames draft picks
Czech ice hockey defencemen
Dresdner Eislöwen players
Heilbronner EC players
Stadion Hradec Králové players
HC Karlovy Vary players
Löwen Frankfurt players
Melville Millionaires players
Orli Znojmo players
Piráti Chomutov players
Rytíři Kladno players
HC Slovan Bratislava players
HC Slovan Ústečtí Lvi players
Spokane Chiefs players
Sportovní Klub Kadaň players
Sportspeople from Chomutov
1. EV Weiden players
Czech expatriate ice hockey players in Canada
Czech expatriate ice hockey players in Slovakia
Czech expatriate ice hockey players in the United States
Czech expatriate ice hockey players in Germany